This is a list of St Mirren Football Club seasons up to the present day. The list details St Mirren's record in major league and cup competitions, and the club's top league goal scorer of each season. Top scorers in bold were also the top scorers in St Mirren's division that season. Records of regular minor competitions, such as the Renfrewshire Cup which the club has won 55 times, are not included.

Summary

Founded in 1877, Paisley-based St Mirren have spent the majority of their history in the top division of the Scottish football league system, having been one of the founder members of the Scottish Football League in 1890. They have never won the competition, finishing 3rd in 1893, matched 87 years later in 1980.

The early 1980s were a strong period for the club as they qualified for the UEFA Cup through league position on three occasions, and also entered the European Cup Winners' Cup after winning the 1987 Scottish Cup Final, the last time the trophy was claimed by a team with an entirely Scottish line-up. That was their third victory in the competition, after success in 1926 and 1959, in their sixth final overall. Following two of those wins, informal 'challenges' over two legs were played against the English FA Cup winners, resulting in a win over Nottingham Forest in 1959; the second leg of the 1987 tie against Coventry City was never completed.

Saints have also won the Scottish League Cup once, in 2013 after finishing runners-up twice (1955, 2010), and also claimed minor honours such as the Scottish Challenge Cup and the defunct Anglo-Scottish Cup once each, as well as the wartime 1919 Victory Cup and 1943 Summer Cup trophies.

Seasons
Key

Notes

League performance summary 
The Scottish Football League was founded in 1890 and, other than during seven years of hiatus during World War II, the national top division has been played every season since. The following is a summary of St Mirren's divisional status:

123 total eligible seasons (including 2019–20)
99 seasons in top level
24 seasons in second level
0 seasons in third level
0 seasons in fourth level

References

External links
Soccerbase
FitbaStats
StMirren.info 'Through The Years'
Football Club History Database

Seasons
 
Saint Mirren